The Taipa line is the first operational Macau Light Rapid Transit line. The monorail line has a U-shaped route within the island of Taipa and currently connects 11 stations; a link to Macau Peninsula is under construction.

Stations

References

Light rail in Macau
2019 establishments in China
Railway lines opened in 2019